Crystal Logic is the third studio album by the American 
heavy metal band Manilla Road, released in December 1983 (and reissued in 2002). On this album the band fully embraced heavy metal, leaving behind the space, progressive and hard rock influences which could be found on the two previous albums.

Critical reception

In the magazine Metal Forces, Bernard Doe wrote, "Manilla Road suffer the same problem as Brocas Helm in sounding a little dated in style. But let's not take away the band's musicianship which is quite excellent throughout, especially guitarist Mark Shelton's riffing and soloing".

In 2005, Crystal Logic was ranked number 344 in Rock Hard magazine's book of The 500 Greatest Rock & Metal Albums of All Time.

Aaron Lariviere of The A.V. Club named it one of 1983's "excellent but tragically underrated records".

Track listing
All songs written by Mark Shelton.

Personnel
Band
 Mark Shelton – lead vocals, 6- and 12-string guitars, arrangement
 Scott Park – bass, arrangement
 Rick Fisher – drums, percussion, backing vocals, arrangement

Production
Larry Funk – engineer
John Jinks – front cover art
Cinda Hughes – back cover art
Manilla Road – front cover design
Mike Arnold - dust sleeve photo
Sherry Avett, Mark Shelton – back cover design

References

Manilla Road albums
1983 albums